Zagros District is a district (bakhsh) in Chardavol County, Ilam Province, Iran. At the 2006 census, its population was 8,017, in 1,670 families.  The District has one city: Balavah.  The District has two rural districts (dehestan): Bijnavand Rural District and Ghaleh Rural District.

References 

Districts of Ilam Province
Chardavol County